Axona is a genus of hoverflies consisting of two species, from the family Syrphidae, in the order Diptera.

Systematics
A. chalcopyga (Wiedemann, 1830)

References

Diptera of Asia
Diptera of Australasia
Eristalinae
Hoverfly genera
Taxa named by Francis Walker (entomologist)